The Doors is the debut studio album by American rock band the Doors, released on January 4, 1967. It was recorded in August 1966 at Sunset Sound Recorders, Hollywood, California, under the production of Paul A. Rothchild. Since its release, the record has been often regarded as one of the greatest debut albums of all time, by both music critics and publishers. It features the long version of the breakthrough single "Light My Fire" and the lengthy song "The End" with its Oedipal spoken word section.

The Doors were working the material of their debut album throughout the year of 1966 at the Whisky a Go Go. The album's recording started after their dismissal from the venue, under the maintenance of Elektra Records. The recording of The Doors established the band's large extensive number of musical influences, such as jazz, classical, blues, pop, R&B and rock music. It has been viewed as an essential part of the psychedelic rock evolution, while also being acknowledged as a source of inspiration to other works.

The Doors and "Light My Fire" have been inducted into the Grammy Hall of Fame. In 2015 the Library of Congress selected The Doors for inclusion in the National Recording Registry based on its cultural, artistic or historical significance. The Doors remains the band's best-selling studio album, with sales of over 13 million copies, as of 2015.

Background 
The Doors' final lineup was formed in mid-1965 after keyboardist Ray Manzarek's two brothers Rick and Jim Manczarek left Rick & the Ravens, whose members included besides Manzarek, jazz-influenced drummer John Densmore and then-novice vocalist Jim Morrison. The group was integrated when guitarist Robby Krieger agreed to join. Though he had previous experience playing folk and flamenco, Krieger had only been playing the electric guitar for a few months when he was invited to become a member of the band, soon renamed the Doors. They were initially signed to Columbia Records under a six-month contract, but they asked for an early release after the record company failed to secure a producer for the album and placed them on a drop list.

Following their release from the label, the Doors played residencies in mid-1966 at two historic Sunset Strip club venues, the London Fog and Whisky a Go Go. They were spotted at the Whisky a Go Go by Elektra Records president Jac Holzman, who was present at the suggestion of Love singer Arthur Lee. After he saw two sets, Holzman called producer Paul A. Rothchild to see the group. On August 18, after attending several appearances of the band, Holzman and Rothchild ultimately signed them to Elektra Records.

The Doors continued performing at the Whisky a Go Go until on August 21, when they were fired due to their performance of "The End" on which Jim Morrison added an improvised retelling section of the Greek myth of Oedipus. Morrison had missed the first of two sets that night, as he had stayed at the Tropicana Hotel, tripping on LSD.

Recording 

The Doors was recorded by producer Paul A. Rothchild and audio engineer Bruce Botnick at Sunset Sound Studios in Hollywood, California, about a week in August 1966. "Indian Summer" and "Moonlight Drive" were the first rehearsal outtakes of the album, while the first actual songs recorded that appeared being "I Looked at You" and "Take It as It Comes". A four-track tape machine was used at the cost of approximately $10,000. Three of the tracks were utilized as: bass and drums on one, guitar and organ on another, and Morrison's vocals on the third. The fourth track was used for overdubbing (mainly Morrison's backing and harmony vocals and bass guitar). The album's instrumentation includes keyboards, electric guitar, occasional bass, drums, and marxophone (on "Alabama Song"). Rothchild had forbidden Krieger from using any of his guitar effects (particularly the wah wah pedal) on the record in order to avoid what Rothchild thought was the over use of these devices. However, the studio was equipped with an echo chamber which gave that specific effect to the sound.

According to Botnick, "What you hear on the first album is what they did live. It wasn't just playing the song–it transcended that." However, session musician Larry Knechtel and Krieger overdubbed bass guitar on several tracks in order to give some "punch" to the sound of Manzarek's keyboard bass.  For "The End" and "Light My Fire", two takes were edited together to achieve the final recording. The album was mixed and completed in October 1966. Although "Indian Summer" was recorded during the sessions and thought was given to including it as the final track, it was eventually replaced with "The End".

Composition 
The Doors features many of the group's most famous compositions, including "Light My Fire", "Break On Through (To the Other Side)", and "The End". In 1969, Morrison stated:

Interviewed by Lizze James, he pointed out the meaning of the verse "My only friend, the end":

"Break On Through (To the Other Side)" was released as the group's first single but it was relatively unsuccessful, peaking at No. 104 in Cash Box and No. 126 in Billboard. Elektra Records edited the line "she gets high", knowing a drug reference would discourage airplay (many releases have the original portions of both "Break On Through" and "The End" edited). The song is in 4/4 time and quite fast-paced, starting with Densmore's bossa nova drum groove in which a clave pattern is played as a rim click underneath a driving ride cymbal pattern. Densmore appreciated the new bossa nova craze coming from Brazil, so he decided to use it in the song. Robby Krieger has stated that he took the idea for the guitar riff from Paul Butterfield's version of the song "Shake Your Moneymaker" (originally by blues guitarist Elmore James). Later, a disjointed quirky organ solo is played quite similar to the introduction of Ray Charles' "What'd I Say".

The Doors' breakout hit "Light My Fire" was primarily composed by Krieger. Although the album version was just over seven minutes long, it was widely requested for radio play, so a single version was edited to under three minutes with nearly all the instrumental break removed for airplay on AM radio. While recalling its writing process, Krieger has claimed that it was Morrison who encouraged the others to write songs when they realized they did not have enough original material.

Additionally, Morrison wrote "Take It as It Comes", which is thought to be a "tribute to Maharishi Mahesh Yogi". It came from one of his observations on Yogi's meditation classes, which Morrison wasn't initially studying contrary to the other group members, but was later convinced by them to attend. Manzarek's organ solo on the song was inspired by Johann Sebastian Bach. The lyrics to "Twentieth Century Fox" refer to either Manzarek's wife Dorothy Fujikawa, or Morrison's girlfriend Pamela Courson.

The Doors also contains two cover songs: "Alabama Song" and "Back Door Man". "Alabama Song" was written and composed by Bertolt Brecht and Kurt Weill in 1927, for their opera Aufstieg und Fall der Stadt Mahagonny (Rise and Fall of the City of Mahagonny). The melody is changed and the verse beginning "Show me the way to the next little dollar" is omitted. On the album version, Morrison altered the second verse from "Show us the way to the next pretty boy" to "Show me the way to the next little girl", but on the 1967 Live at the Matrix recording, he sings the original "next pretty boy". The Chicago blues "Back Door Man" was written by Willie Dixon and originally recorded by Howlin' Wolf.

Releases 
The Doors was released on January 4, 1967, by Elektra Records. Jac Holzman initially intended to release the record in November 1966, but following a negotiation with the other members of the band, he decided to postpone the release to the next year, as he felt the period was appropriate time for album sales. For the album's cover, Joel Brodsky was hired to provide a photo of the group, which later received a Grammy nomination. Holzman also suggested an association with Billboard magazine for the album's advertisement by promoting the record with hoarding, a novel concept which was made popular later on. It was propelled under the stationery "Break On Through With An Electrifying Album". The Doors were the first rock band to use this advertising medium.

The Doors made a steady climb up the Billboard 200, ultimately becoming a huge success in the US once the edited single version of "Light My Fire" scaled the charts to become No. 1, with the album peaking at No. 2 on the chart in September 1967 (stuck behind the Beatles' Sgt. Pepper's Lonely Hearts Club Band) and going on to achieve multi-platinum status. In Europe the band would have to wait slightly longer for similar recognition, with "Light My Fire" originally stalling at No. 49 in the UK singles chart and the album failing to chart at all; however, in 1991, buoyed by the high-profile Oliver Stone film The Doors, a reissue of "Light My Fire" reached No. 7 in the singles chart, and the album reached No. 43.

The mono LP was withdrawn not long after its original release and remained unavailable until 2009, when it was reissued as a limited edition 180 gram audiophile LP by Rhino Records. The 40th anniversary mix of the debut album presents a stereo version of "Light My Fire" in speed-corrected form for the first time. Previously, only the original 45 RPM singles ("Light My Fire" and "Break On Through") were produced at the correct speed.

Reissues 
The Doors was reissued several times since the 1980s. In 1981, Mobile Fidelity Sound Lab released a half speed mastered version of the album on vinyl, cut by Stan Ricker with the Ortofon Cutting System. In 1988, it was digitally remastered by Bruce Botnick and Paul A. Rothchild at Digital Magnetics, using the original master tapes. In 1992, DCC Compact Classics reissued the album on 24kt gold CD and 180g vinyl; the gold CD was remastered by Steve Hoffman while the vinyl was cut by Kevin Gray and Hoffman at Future Disc. It was remastered again in 1999 for The Complete Studio Recordings box set by Bernie Grundman and Botnick at Bernie Grundman Mastering using 96khz/24bit technology; it was also released as a standalone CD release. In 2006, the record was released in multichannel DVD-Audio as part of the Perception box set. The next year, a 40th anniversary edition was released featuring the 2006 stereo remix and three bonus tracks, which was mastered by Botnick at Uniteye. In 2009, the original mono mix was released on 180g vinyl, cut by Grundman.

On September 14, 2011, The Doors was released on hybrid stereo-multichannel Super Audio CD by Warner Japan in their Warner Premium Sound series. Analogue Productions reissued the album on hybrid SACD and double 45 RPM vinyl, both editions were mastered by Doug Sax and Sangwook Nam at The Mastering Lab; the CD layer of the Super Audio CD contains the original stereo mix while the SACD layer contains Botnick's 2006 5.1 surround mix. In 2017, a deluxe edition was released in commemoration of the album's 50th anniversary, and includes the original stereo and mono mixes, as well as a compilation of songs recorded live at The Matrix in San Francisco on March 7, 1967. This edition was remastered by Botnick from "recently discovered original master tapes".

Reception and legacy 

In a contemporary review for Crawdaddy! magazine, founder and critic Paul Williams hailed The Doors as "an album of magnitude" while likening the band to Brian Wilson and the Rolling Stones as creators of "modern music", with which "contemporary 'jazz' and 'classical' composers must try to measure up". Williams added: "The birth of the group is in this album, and it's as good as anything in rock. The awesome fact about the Doors is that they will improve." Record Mirror was similarly positive to the record: "[The Doors] for Elektra is wild, rough and although it's subtle in places, the overall sound is torrid. They're blues-based and get quite an effective sound."  Paul McCartney of the Beatles has claimed that following the album's release, he wanted his band to capture the Doors' musical style as one of the "alter egos" of the group for their upcoming concept album Sgt. Pepper's Lonely Hearts Club Band.

Robert Christgau was less enthusiastic in his column for Esquire, recommending the album but with reservations; he approved of Manzarek's organ playing and Morrison's "flexible though sometimes faint" singing while highlighting the presence of a "great hard rock original" in "Break on Through" and clever songs such as "Twentieth Century Fox", but was critical of more "esoteric" material such as the "long, obscure dirge" "The End". He also found Morrison's lyrics often self-indulgent, particularly lines like "our love becomes a funeral pyre", which he said spoiled "Light My Fire", and "the nebulousness that passes for depth among so many lovers of rock poetry" on "The End".

The Doors has since been frequently ranked by critics as one of the greatest albums of all time; according to Acclaimed Music, it is the 36th most ranked record on all-time lists. In 1998, the album was named the 70th greatest album of all time in a "Music of the Millennium" poll conducted in the UK by HMV Group, Channel 4, The Guardian and Classic FM. In 2003, Parke Puterbaugh of Rolling Stone called the record "the L.A. foursome's most successful marriage of rock poetics with classically tempered hard rocka stoned, immaculate classic." Sean Egan of BBC Music opines, "The eponymous debut of the Doors took popular music into areas previously thought impossible: the incitement to expand one's consciousness of opener 'Break on Through' was just the beginning of its incendiary agenda." AllMusic critic Richie Unterberger, lauded The Doors as a "tremendous debut album, and indeed one of the best first-time outings in rock history", concluding in his review that "The End" was "a haunting cap to an album whose nonstop melodicism and dynamic tension would never be equaled by the group again, let alone bettered."

The Doors has been numerously cited as the group's finest record. In 2000, the album was voted number 46 in Colin Larkin's All Time Top 1000 Albums. The Doors was ranked No. 42 on Rolling Stones list of "The 500 Greatest Albums of All Time". When the list was revised in 2020, the album was repositioned at No. 86. Two of the album's songs, "Light My Fire" and "The End", were also among on Rolling Stones 2004 list "The 500 Greatest Songs of All Time". Q magazine readers ranked the album at No. 75 on its list of the "100 Greatest Albums Ever", while NME magazine at No. 226 on their respective list "500 Greatest Albums of All Time". In 2007, Rolling Stone included it on their list of The 40 Essential Albums of 1967. More recently in 2020, online media magazine Loudwire placed The Doors one of the "25 Legendary Rock Albums With No Weak Songs". In a list published the next year in February, Ultimate Classic Rock cited it as the fourth-top psychedelic rock album of all time.

 Track listing 
Original album
All tracks are written by the Doors (Jim Morrison, Ray Manzarek, Robby Krieger and John Densmore), except where noted.  Details are taken from the 1967 U.S. Elektra release; other releases may show different information.

Reissues

 Personnel 
Personnel adapted from the 50th Anniversary edition album liner notes:The Doors Jim Morrison – vocals
 Ray Manzarek – organ, piano, bass; backing vocals and marxophone on "Alabama Song (Whisky Bar)"
 Robby Krieger – guitar; bass guitar on "Soul Kitchen" and "Back Door Man"; backing vocals on "Alabama Song (Whisky Bar)"
 John Densmore – drums, backing vocals on "Alabama Song (Whisky Bar)"Additional musicians Larry Knechtel – bass guitar on "Soul Kitchen", "Twentieth Century Fox", "Light My Fire", "I Looked at You" and "Take It as It Comes"Production Paul A. Rothchild – production; backing vocals on "Alabama Song (Whisky Bar)"
 Bruce Botnick – engineering
 Joel Brodsky – back cover photography
 Guy Webster – front cover photography
 William S. Harvey – art direction and design

 Charts AlbumSingles'

Certifications

Notes

References

Sources 
 
 
 
 
  &

External links 
 

The Doors albums
1967 debut albums
Grammy Hall of Fame Award recipients
Albums produced by Paul A. Rothchild
Elektra Records albums
Albums with cover art by Joel Brodsky
United States National Recording Registry recordings
Albums recorded at Sunset Sound Recorders
United States National Recording Registry albums